Butocrysa is a monotypic beetle genus in the family Cerambycidae described by Thomson in 1868. Its only species, Butocrysa insignis, was described by Hippolyte Lucas in 1857.

References

Hemilophini
Beetles described in 1857
Monotypic Cerambycidae genera